Feelin' Kinda Patton is stand-up comedian Patton Oswalt's first comedy album.  It is a recording of a performance at the 40 Watt Club in Athens, Georgia.  Feelin' Kinda Patton is an abridged version of the previously released 222 (Live & Uncut).  A limited vinyl edition of this album was issued in May 2008 by Stand Up! Records and features a cover with cut out playset and characters from the album by Mike 2600.

Track listing

Personnel
Patton Oswalt - Performer
Ron Baldwin - Producer
Henry H. Owings - Producer
Chris Bilheimer - Design
Fred Maher - Mixing
Brian McCall - Photography
Curt Wells - Live Recording Engineer

References

Patton Oswalt albums
2004 live albums
United Musicians live albums